Taira Uematsu (born September 26, 1983) is a Japanese professional baseball coach for the San Francisco Giants of Major League Baseball (MLB). He is the first full-time Japanese coach in MLB history.

References

Living people
Year of birth uncertain
People from Tateyama, Chiba
San Francisco Giants coaches
Major League Baseball bench coaches
1983 births